Amphonyx vitrinus is a moth of the  family Sphingidae. It is known from Cuba and Hispaniola.

Adults are probably on wing year round. They nectar at flowers.

The larvae probably feed on Annonaceae species.

References

Amphonyx
Moths described in 1910
Moths of the Caribbean